Dundas (called Dundas and Follett 1856–59) was an electoral district of the Legislative Assembly in the Australian state of Victoria from 1856 to 1976. It covered a region of western Victoria and consisted of the counties of Dundas and Follett.

The district of Dundas and Follett was one of the initial districts created in the first Victorian Legislative Assembly, 1856. It was renamed Dundas from 1859 as a result of the Electoral Act (of December 1858) although it covered the same area as Dundas and Follett previously.

Later its borders were re-arranged somewhat and included the sub-divisions of Harrow, Casterton, Hamilton, Branxholme, Penshurst and Mortlake.

Members

Election results

References

Former electoral districts of Victoria (Australia)
1856 establishments in Australia
1976 disestablishments in Australia